Two pharaohs of Ancient Egypt's 30th dynasty shared the name Nectanebo:

Nectanebo I (ruled 380 to 362 BC)
Nectanebo II (ruled 360 to 343 BC)